
Gmina Tyrawa Wołoska is a rural gmina (administrative district) in Sanok County, Subcarpathian Voivodeship, in south-eastern Poland.

Ethnic Groups
Poles

The gmina contains part of the protected area called Słonne Mountains Landscape Park.

Villages
Gmina Tyrawa Wołoska contains the villages and settlements of Hołuczków, Kreców, Lachawa, Rakowa, Rozpucie, Siemuszowa, Tyrawa Wołoska and Wola Krecowska.

Neighbouring gminas
Gmina Tyrawa Wołoska is bordered by the gminas of Bircza, Lesko, Olszanica and Sanok.

Rural landscape picture

References
Polish official population figures 2006

Tyrawa Woloska
Sanok County